Maggie Hardy (born December 7, 1965) is an American billionaire businesswoman and the owner of 84 Lumber and Nemacolin Woodlands Resort, both founded by her father Joseph A. Hardy III. In 2022, Forbes estimated her personal fortune at around $1.4 billion.

Biography 
Maggie Hardy was the fifth of five children in her household. Her oldest brother is 20 years older than her. Growing up, Hardy Knox always maintained a very close relationship with her father. She studied at West Virginia University but dropped out after two years.

She joined the family business in 1987, and was put in charge of developing Nemacolin Woodlands into a luxury resort.

In 1992, her father gave her the ownership and management of 84 Lumber. She was 26. The following year, sales reached $1 billion.

Personal life
In 1992, she married Peter J. Magerko, a former member of the Marine Corps and the Pennsylvania State Police. They have one son together. In September 2017, she filed for divorce.

On March 30, 2019, she married Shawn Knox in Aspen, Colorado. They live in Pittsburgh.

In 2020, she bought a $16 million mansion in Boca Raton, Florida.

Advertising controversy
Hardy helped develop 84 Lumber's 2017 Super Bowl commercial, which stirred controversy before airing for featuring a border wall separating a mother and child from presumed freedom, following their visibly arduous journey to it. The wall was deemed too political by Fox, and so was edited out for broadcast. The Washington Times reported that she "says she’s a staunch supporter of President Trump and his proposed U.S.-Mexico border wall" and that she "said she personally helped develop the commercial but said her politics had nothing to do with its message."

Awards 

 2020: Career Achievement Award by Pittsburgh Business Times during the Women of Influence event

References

1965 births
Living people
American billionaires
Female billionaires
American retail chief executives
West Virginia University alumni